Gioas re di Giuda (Joas, king of Judah) is an Italian-language oratorio libretto by Pietro Metastasio written in 1735 for imperial court composer Georg Reutter the younger and later set by at least 25 composers. The plot is based on the life of King Joash of Judah.

Settings
Johann Georg Reutter, 1735, Hofburgkapelle, Vienna
Vaclav Matyas Guretzky, 1736, Brünn
Giuseppe Maria Orlandini, 1744, Pistoia
Niccolò Jommelli, 1745, Ospedale degl’Incurabili, Venice
Gennaro Manna, 1747, Naples
Georg Christoph Wagenseil, 1755, Burgtheater, Vienna
Antonio Sacchini, 1767, Oratorio dei Filippini di Santa Maria in Vallicella, Rome
Luigi Boccherini, 1770, S. Maria di Corteorlandini, Lucca
J. C. Bach, 22 March 1770, King's Theatre, Haymarket, London
Antonio Cartellieri, 29 March 1795, Vienna
Joseph Schuster, 1803, Dresden
Luigi Mosca, 1806, Palermo

The 1823 setting of an anonymous libretto by Simone Mayr, Innalzamento al trono del giovane re Gioas, is only thematically based on Metastasio's original.

References

Libretti by Metastasio
1735 compositions
Oratorios based on the Bible